The 1972–73 Sheffield Shield season was the 71st season of the Sheffield Shield, the domestic first-class cricket competition of Australia. Western Australia won the championship. The points system changed with ten points now awarded for a win.

Table

Statistics

Most Runs
Doug Walters 654

Most Wickets
Ashley Mallett 49

References

Sheffield Shield
Sheffield Shield
Sheffield Shield seasons